Groppo is a surname. Notable people with the surname include:

John Groppo (1921–2013), American mason contractor, businessman, and politician
Marco Groppo (born 1960), Italian professional cyclist

See also
Trill (music)